Sick-O is an EP by 3X Krazy. It was released on August 5, 1995 for Str8 Game Records and featured production from Tone Capone.

Track listing
"Hit the Gas" - 5:02 (Featuring Harm)
"Somethin' 4 Dat Ass" - 4:08
"Sick-O" - 5:53 (Featuring Seagram & Gangsta P)
"Hoe Fuckin' Season" - 4:43 (Featuring Father Dom)
"Put Me to the Test" - 6:17 (Featuring N-D-Cent)
"Sunshine in the O" - 5:07 (Featuring Michael Marshall)
"In the Town" - 5:07

References

1995 debut EPs
3X Krazy albums
Gangsta rap EPs
G-funk EPs